is a Japanese food product made from twice-fried soybeans. It is produced by cutting tofu into thin slices and deep-frying them first at 110–120 °C, and then again at 180–200 °C. Abura-age is often used to wrap , and is added to miso soup. It is also added to udon noodle dishes, which are called kitsune-udon because of legends that foxes (kitsune) like deep-fried tofu. Abura-age can also be stuffed, e.g. with nattō, before frying again.

The Japanese were the first to develop tofu pouches. However, little is known of their early history. The Tofu Hyakuchin of 1782 (Abe 1972) gave a recipe for deep-fried tofu, but it is not clear if it puffed up like a tofu pouch. It is known that tofu pouches existed by 1853, when inari-zushi (tofu pouches filled with vinegared rice) originated (Ichiyama 1968). Because of their long storage life, light weight, and complexity of production, tofu pouches lend themselves to large-scale factory production and widespread distribution. By 1974 large factories were using two metric tons of soybeans a day to make 116,600 tofu pouches. By 1980 huge modern factories produced 300,000 to 450,000 pouches a day using conveyorized deep fryers. At this time roughly a third of the soybeans consumed for tofu in Japan were for deep-fried tofu, and an estimated 85 percent of this was for tofu pouches.

In Japanese mythology abura-age is the favorite food of kitsune and Inari.

See also
 Tofu skin
 
 
 
 
 Fu (麩)

References

 Kenkyusha's New Japanese-English Dictionary, Kenkyusha Limited, Tokyo 1991, 

Tofu
Japanese cuisine terms
Deep fried foods
Soy-based foods